Orygmophora is a monotypic moth genus of the family Erebidae. Its only species, Orygmophora mediofoveata, is found in Ghana, Nigeria and Sierra Leone. Both the genus and species were first described by George Hampson in 1926.

Its host plants include Nauclea diderrichii.

References

External links
Original description of genus and species: 

Calpinae
Monotypic moth genera